The 'Campeonato Argentino de Rugby 1987 was won by the selection of Unión de Rugby de Tucumàn that beat in the final the selection of Unión Cordobesa de Rugby.

In this edition, eas changed the formula, with 18 teams divided in 6 pools called "Zonas". The winners of each pool go to the "final for title" and the other to a "classification tournament". It was a transition to the new formula, that introduced from 1988 divisions with relegation and promotions.

 Rugby Union in Argentina in 1987 

National
 The Buenos Aires Champsionship was won by San Isidro Club
 The Cordoba Province Championship was won by La Tablada
 The North-East Championship was won by Los Tarcos
 The selection of Tucumàn and the selection of Rosario won ex-aequo the "Juvenil" (under 21 championship), drawing (28-28) the final.

International
 The "Pumas" won easily (40-12) against Spain, during the tour of European team  in South America.
 They won also the last test before the World Cup against Uruguay (38-3)
 At the first edition of World Cup the "Pumas", was eliminated since the first round. It was fatal the defeat against Fiji.  As consolation, to the Pumas remain the victory against Italy

 After the World Cup, Australia visited Argentina on tour. The first  match was drawn (19-19). Wallabies, won the second test (27-19). 

 Against Australia close for a first time his international career Hugo Porta (but there were a comeback in 1990)

 Preliminary Phase Ranking: 1°Córdoba 4 pt.; 2° Entre Ríos 2 pt.; Austral 0 pt.Ranking: 1° Cuyo 4 pt.; 2° Sgo.del Estero 2 pt.; Santa Fe 0 pt..Ranking: . 1° Tucumán 4 pt.; 2° Noreste 2 pt.; 3° Alto Valle 0 pt..Ranking: 1° Salta 4 pt.; 2° Mar del Plata 2 pt.; 3° Jujuy 0 pt..
 Ranking: 1° Buenos Aires 4 pt.; 2° Misiones 2 pt.; 3° Sur 0 pt..Ranking: 1° San Juan 4 pt.; 2° Rosario 2 pt.; 3° Chubut 0 pt..

 13th Place tournament Ranking: 1° Santa Fe 4 pt.; 2° Alto Valle 2 pt.; Chubut 0 pt..Ranking: 1° Sur 4 pt.; 2° Jujuy 2 pt.; 3° Austral 0 pt.

 7th Place tournament Ranking: 1° Noreste 3 pt.; 2° Rosario 2 pt.; 3° Sgo.del Estero 1 pt..Ranking: 1° Entre Ríos 3 pt. (+ 33); 2° Mar del Plata 3 pt. (+ 13); 3° Misiones 0 pt.
 

 Pool for Title Ranking: 1° Tucumán 4 pt.; 2° Salta 2 pt.; 3° San Juan 0 pt..
 Ranking:''' 1°Córdoba 4 pt.; 2° Cuyo 2 pt.; 3° Buenos Aires 0 pt.

 Finals 

 External links 
 Memorias de la UAR 1987
  Francesco Volpe, Paolo Pacitti (Author), Rugby 2000'', GTE Gruppo Editorale (1999)

Campeonato Argentino de Rugby
Argentina
Rugby